"Naked Without You" is a song by British band Roachford, released in 1998 as the third and final single from their 1997 album Feel. The song was co-written by Andrew Roachford, Rick Nowels and Billy Steinberg. It reached No. 53 on the UK Singles Chart.

Taylor Dayne version

American singer Taylor Dayne recorded "Naked Without You" for her 1998 album of the same name. It was released in 1999 as the third and final single from the album. The song is originally a ballad, but due to the dance remixes served by Thunderpuss 2000, it became a hit in the clubs, subsequently peaking at No. 3 on Billboard's Hot Dance Music/Club Play chart.

Track listing
CD maxi single
"Naked Without You" (Thunderpuss 2000 Club Anthem)
"Naked Without You" (ThunderDUB)
"Naked Without You" (TP2K Mixshow Mix) 	
"Naked Without You" (Thunderpuss 2000 Radio Edit) 	
"Naked Without You" (Album Mix)

Other versions
English singer Joe Cocker recorded his version for his seventeenth studio album No Ordinary World, released in 1999.

References

1997 songs
1998 singles
1999 singles
Roachford songs
Taylor Dayne songs
Songs written by Andrew Roachford
Songs written by Rick Nowels
Songs written by Billy Steinberg